This is a list of episodes for the television series Family.

Series overview

Episodes

Season 1 (1976)

Season 2 (1976–77)

Season 3 (1977–78)

Season 4 (1978–79)

Season 5 (1979–80)

References
 

Family